Events in the year 1938 in Portugal.

Incumbents
President: Óscar Carmona
Prime Minister: António de Oliveira Salazar

Events
30 October – Portuguese legislative election, 1938.

Arts and entertainment

Sports
Merelinense F.C. founded
Moreirense F.C. founded

Births

11 February – Simone de Oliveira, singer and actress

Deaths
1 December – Alfredo Rodrigues Gaspar, military officer and politician (born 1865)

References

 
Years of the 20th century in Portugal
Portugal
1930s in Portugal
Portugal